225 (two hundred [and] twenty-five) is the natural number following 224 and preceding 226.

In mathematics 

225  is the smallest number that is a polygonal number in five different ways. It is a square number ,
an octagonal number, and a squared triangular number  .

As the square of a double factorial,  counts the number of permutations of six items in which all cycles have even length, or the number of permutations in which all cycles have odd length. And as one of the Stirling numbers of the first kind, it counts the number of permutations of six items with exactly three cycles.

225 is a highly composite odd number, meaning that it has more divisors than any smaller odd numbers.

225 is the smallest square number to have one of every digit in some number base (225 is 3201 in base 4) 

225 is the first odd number with exactly 9 divisors.

References

Integers